The Deputy Minister for Macedonia and Thrace is the government minister in charge of Greece's Sub-Ministry of Macedonia and Thrace, part of the Ministry of the Interior.

The department originated in the old Ministry of Northern Greece, which was renamed the Ministry of Macedonia and Thrace on 19 August 1988.

The ministry was abolished on 7 October 2009 and downgraded to a general secretariat within the Ministry of the Interior, but was re-established on 21 June 2012. On 27 January 2015, it was again demoted to a sub-ministry within the Ministry of the Interior.

Ministers for Northern Greece (1974–1988)

Ministers for Macedonia and Thrace (1988–2009)

Ministers for Macedonia and Thrace (2012–2015)

Deputy Ministers for Macedonia and Thrace (since 2015)

References

External links
Webpage of the Ministry (in Greek)

Government of Greece
Lists of government ministers of Greece